ŽFK Kočani (Macedonian: Женски фудбалски клуб Кочани) is a women's football club from Kočani, North Macedonia. The team was founded in 2006 and won the national championship in 2013–14.

History
The club was founded in 2006. In 2014 it reached the cup final for the first time which they then won 5–2 over ŽFK Konsuli. Also in 2013/14 it won the national league.

Titles
 Macedonian women's football championship: 2013–14
 Macedonian Women's Cup: 2014, 2015

UEFA Competitions Record
The 2014–15 season was the first in UEFA competitions for the team. All games were lost.

References

External links
Facebook profile

Women's football clubs in North Macedonia
Association football clubs established in 2006
ZFK Kocani